Puerto Quito is a town and urban parish in the province of Pichincha, Ecuador. The town is a developing area for ecotourism, thanks to an abundance of wildlife, secondary jungle and beautiful waterfalls such as the Cascada Azul (Blue Waterfall). Puerto Quito is situated beside a major bridge over the river Caoní on the main road from Quito to the coast. By road, Quito is 140 km or 3.5 hours by bus.

Geography and climate
Although geographically part of the Sierra region of Ecuador, Puerto Quito's climate and geography is closer to that of the coastal region. The town is located in the tropical forest of Ecuador. As such, it has a higher temperature than the rest of the province, averaging around 25 degree Celsius year-round. Average rainfall is between one and two meters a year.

External links
Official website 
Tourist Information - (English and Spanish)
Information about Puerto Quito - Government of Pichincha Province (Spanish)

Populated places in Pichincha Province